Brian Derreck Reese (born July 2, 1971) is a former professional basketball player and current assistant coach at Monmouth. He was a 6'6" player from the Bronx, NY. Reese went to High School at St. Nicholas of Tolentine High School where he was a McDonald's All-American.

College
Reese was born in Brooklyn, New York. He won the NCAA National Championship under Dean Smith with the University of North Carolina in 1993. He felt Dean Smith was a major influence on his life.

Professional career
Reese went on to play professionally in Austria, Belgium, the Dominican Republic, England (Manchester Giants), Finland, Iceland, France, Korea, Taiwan and Puerto Rico. He also played three seasons for the Long Island Surf of the United States Basketball League (USBL). He served as the coach at Georgian Court University.

Coaching career
He was an assistant coach at Monmouth University previously before accepting his current position at ISU.

References

External links
Illinois State Redbirds coaching bio
Úrvalsdeild karla statistics at kki.is
College statistics at sports-reference.com
Finnish league statistics

1971 births
Living people
American expatriate basketball people in Austria
American expatriate basketball people in Belgium
American expatriate basketball people in the Dominican Republic
American expatriate basketball people in Finland
American expatriate basketball people in France
American expatriate basketball people in Iceland
American expatriate basketball people in South Korea
American expatriate basketball people in Taiwan
American expatriate basketball people in the United Kingdom
American men's basketball players
Basketball players from New York City
High Point Panthers men's basketball coaches
High school basketball coaches in the United States
Illinois State Redbirds men's basketball coaches
McDonald's High School All-Americans
Monmouth Hawks men's basketball coaches
North Carolina Tar Heels men's basketball players
Parade High School All-Americans (boys' basketball)
Þór Akureyri men's basketball players
Small forwards
Sportspeople from the Bronx
United States Basketball League players
Úrvalsdeild karla (basketball) players